Urodacus similis is a species of scorpion in the Urodacidae family. It is endemic to Australia, and was first described in 1977 by L. E. Koch.

Description
The holotype is 72 mm in length. Colouration is light yellow to reddish yellow-brown.

Distribution and habitat
The species occurs in western Western Australia.

References

 

 
similis
Scorpions of Australia
Endemic fauna of Australia
Fauna of Western Australia
Animals described in 1977